F. G. Sir Syed College is a boys college in Rawalpindi, Pakistan. It includes high school (Intermediate level) and graduation classes. It is affiliated with Federal Board of Intermediate and Secondary Education, Islamabad Pakistan, and with University of Punjab for graduation level. This college provide co education at BS level.This college has highest merit compared to all other institutions in Rawalpindi.

History 
The institution began as a Public School in 1958. In 1968 it was raised to an Inter College. Degree classes (bachelors) were introduced in 1972. The schools and college wings were separated in 1975 as independent institutions. 
Prof. Ch. Ghulam Abbas (deceased) was among those who delivered the first ever lecture when the college started. His son, an ex-student of the college, Mr. Naseem Abbas became the first teacher's son to be a lecturer in the same department (Pol.Sc) in January 2000 to 2001 and again in 2005–2006. Dr. Allah Bakhsh Malik, PhD, PAS, UNESCO Confucius Laureate and former Federal Secretary, Government of Pakistan studied here in 1976–78.

Academic Performance 
There are a number of students in Rawalpindi & Islamabad who got A-1 Grade in FBISE. There are more than a thousand students who get admission every year in FG Sir Syed College. This year the college got 2nd and 3rd position in HSSC Part II from FBISE. The students of Sir Syed College have achieved 127 Federal Board positions since its inception. Previous year college achieved 152 A+ grades and 86 A grades.

Administration 
The college was run by the Cantonment Board, Rawalpindi until its nationalization on 1 June 1975. It is presently under the administrative control of the Federal Government Educational Institutions (Cantts/Garrisons) Directorate, GHQ, Rawalpindi.

Principals 
Abdul Qadir Qureshi (1968–1974)
M. H. Hamdani (1974–1982)
Amin Bhatti (1982–1998)
Ghulam Sarwar(1998–2004)
Prof. Muhammad Safdar Satti (2004–2005)
Prof. Obaidullah Bhatti (2005–2009)
Prof. Muhammad Aslam (2009)
Prof. Iftekhar Yousaf (2009–2011)
Prof. Khalid Zareef (2010–2017)
Prof. Abdullah Khan Niazi (2017-2018)
Prof. Muhammad Naeem (2018-2019)
Prof. Irfan (transferred)
Prof. Ahmad Raza (current)

Academic programs 
The college offers Pre-Engineering, Pre-Medical and General Science (With Computer Science & Statistics) subjects to the students who have completed their matriculation (equivalent to O-levels). I.Com program was started in 2009. ICS program was started in the year 2000. It was a brain child of Prof. Zahoor of Statistics Department. He established computer labs and managed these for almost 10 years.
The college also offers HEC-accredited graduation programs for boys and girls, teaching Bachelors in Sciences for Computer Science, Physics, Economics, Mathematics and Urdu. In addition, Bachelors in Business (BBA) is also offered here

Departments

Arts discipline 
English 
Urdu 
Islamic Studies 
History 
Pakistan Studies 
Political Science 
Economics 
Health and Physical Education 
Civics 
History 
Psychology 
Arabic

Science discipline 
Physics 
Chemistry 
Biology 
Mathematics 
Computer Science 
Statistics
Science degree

Notes 

Universities and colleges in Rawalpindi District
Educational institutions established in 1958
1958 establishments in Pakistan